Lastenausgleich ("Burden Equalization") was the post World War II program and laws to recompense Germans and ethnic Germans who fled their homelands for their lost properties. This was a very complicated law that transferred enormous wealth to the immigrants over a period of decades. It may well have provided a strong basis for the Wirtschaftswunder or German "economic miracle" in the post-war era. Economic analysis of this activity could influence modern tax laws for understanding how transfer of wealth through higher minimum wage laws and direct transfers can influence a modern economy.

The value of "lost" property during the war was paid at a rate of 50% of its value quarterly over as much as 30 years. By 1982 over 115 billion DM (about $70 billion US dollars as of 1999, when Germany adopted Euros as its currency) has been spent.  This outweighs hugely the value of something more than $1 billion Germany received through the Marshall Plan.

Books 
 Michael L. Hughes. Shouldering the Burdens of Defeat: West Germany and the Reconstruction of Social Justice. University of North Carolina Press. Chapel Hill 1999

References

Aftermath of World War II in Germany
Human rights by issue
Compensation methods
Development in Europe